Elijah Amo (born February 3, 1999) is an American soccer player who plays as a winger for South Georgia Tormenta in the USL League One.

Career

Youth & College
Amo joined Bethesda SC in 2008 and remained part of the academy until 2017. Here he helped the team win the Maryland State Cup and US Youth Soccer Region 1 Championship in 2012. Amo graduated Cum Laude from Southern High School and was a four-year honor roll member. He also lettered in basketball at Southern High School from 2014 to 2015.

In 2017, Amo attended the University of Louisville to play college soccer. Over four seasons with the Cardinals, Amo made 60 appearances, scoring six goals and tallying four assists.

Professional
On January 21, 2021, Amso was selected 34th overall in the 2021 MLS SuperDraft by Real Salt Lake. However, he went unsigned by the club. 

In 2022, Amo signed with National Independent Soccer Association side Maryland Bobcats. He made 19 regular season appearances for the Bobcats, scoring five goals.

On January 18, 2023, Amo signed with USL League One side South Georgia Tormenta. He made his debut for Tormenta on March 17, 2023, appearing as an 80th-minute substitute during a 1–0 win over North Carolina FC.

Personal
Amo's cousin is fellow soccer player Joe Gyau.

References

External links 
 

1999 births
Living people
American soccer players
Association football midfielders
Louisville Cardinals men's soccer players
Maryland Bobcats FC players
National Independent Soccer Association players
Real Salt Lake draft picks
Soccer players from Maryland
Sportspeople from Baltimore
Tormenta FC players
USL League One players